Events in the year 1903 in Belgium.

Incumbents
Monarch: Leopold II
Prime Minister: Paul de Smet de Naeyer

Events
 30 July-6 August – 2nd Congress of the Russian Social Democratic Labour Party in Brussels.
 15 August – German-Belgian railway convention signed.

Publications
 Biographie Nationale de Belgique, vol. 17.
 Henri Pirenne, Histoire de Belgique, vol. 2
 Max Rooses, Rubens' leven en werken
 Joseph Van den Gheyn, Catalogue des manuscrits de la Bibliothèque royale de Belgique, vol. 3.
 Emile Vandervelde, L'Exode rural et le retour aux champs

Art and architecture

 Théo van Rysselberghe, The Reading

Births
 8 June – Marguerite Yourcenar, French novelist (died 1987)
 19 August - Gérard Devos, footballer (died 1972)

Deaths
 19 June – Fernande de Cartier de Marchienne (born 1872)
 21 July – Henri Alexis Brialmont (born 1821), military architect

References

 
1900s in Belgium